Metz is an unincorporated community in York Township, Steuben County, in the U.S. state of Indiana.

History
In 1836, Fayette Barron was the first settler at the crossroads that would become Metz.

The village of Metz reached its heyday during the late 19th and early 20th century.  By 1885, the village had two dry goods and several other retail shops, a saw mill and a flouring mill, a hotel, various craftsman, and four physicians.

In 1919, the York township schools were consolidated with those of Richland Township into the Metz school.  This school, with students from kindergarten through high school, operated for 40 years, until it was closed in 1959, a victim of falling enrollment. Team name known as the Mohawks.

A post office was established at Metz in 1849, and remained in operation until it was discontinued in 1959.

Today, Metz is a largely a collection of a dozen or so houses, a church, the Metz Apartments, and a pop machine by the firehouse.

Geography

References
Anspaugh, Colleen (1997) "Old towns", Steuben Herald-Republican, Angola, Indiana, p. A3.
Folck, Dorsey (1956) "York Township", Harvey Morley, editor, The 1955 History, Complete County Atlas, pictorial and Biographical Album of Steuben County, Indiana, Angola, Indiana, pp. 46–47.  
History of Steuben County (1885) Inter-State Publishing Co, Chicago.

Unincorporated communities in Steuben County, Indiana
Unincorporated communities in Indiana